Kömbe is a kind of börek from [[Sivas,Elazig, Malatya, Kahramanmaras Province Turkey. It exists in both the cuisine of Turkey and that of Azerbaijan and is popular among both Turkish and Azerbaijani people.

References

Azerbaijani cuisine
Turkish cuisine
Lebanese cuisine